AT rich interactive domain 4A (RBP1-like), also known as ARID4A, is a protein which in humans is encoded by the ARID4A gene.

Function 
The protein encoded by this gene is a ubiquitously expressed nuclear protein. It binds directly, with several other proteins, to retinoblastoma protein (pRB) which regulates cell proliferation. pRB represses transcription by recruiting the encoded protein. This protein, in turn, serves as a bridging molecule to recruit HDACs and, in addition, provides a second HDAC-independent repression function. The encoded protein possesses transcriptional repression activity. Multiple alternatively spliced transcripts have been observed for this gene, although not all transcript variants have been fully described.

Model organisms 

Model organisms have been used in the study of ARID4A function. A conditional knockout mouse line, called Arid4atm1a(EUCOMM)Wtsi was generated as part of the International Knockout Mouse Consortium program — a high-throughput mutagenesis project to generate and distribute animal models of disease to interested scientists — at the Wellcome Trust Sanger Institute. Male and female animals underwent a standardized phenotypic screen to determine the effects of deletion.

Twenty five tests were carried out and nine phenotypes were reported. Fewer homozygous mutant embryos were identified during gestation than expected, and in a separate study less than the predicted Mendelian ratio survived until weaning. Homozygous mutant male adults has a reduced body weight curve and a decreased grip strength. Homozygous mutant adults of both sexes had a decreased body weight as determined by DEXA, displayed vertebral fusion and had clinical chemistry abnormalities including hypoalbuminemia and decreased circulating fructosamine levels. They also had haematological defects and an increased NK cell number.

Interactions 
ARID4A has been shown to interact with Retinoblastoma protein.

References

Further reading

External links 
 
 
 

Transcription factors
Genes mutated in mice